The following is a list of notable deaths in January 2019.

Entries for each day are listed alphabetically by surname. A typical entry lists information in the following sequence:
 Name, age, country of citizenship at birth, subsequent country of citizenship (if applicable), reason for notability, cause of death (if known), and reference.

January 2019

1
Ludwig W. Adamec, 94, Austrian-born American historian.
Ross Allen, 90, New Zealand local politician, chair of Taranaki Regional Council (1989–2001), and cricket umpire.
Yuri Artsutanov, 89, Russian engineer.
Jamal Ahmad Mohammad Al Badawi, 58, Yemeni militant (Islamic Jihad of Yemen), airstrike.
Dagfinn Bakke, 85, Norwegian artist.
Ed Corney, 85, American bodybuilder.
Ivan Dimitrov, 83, Bulgarian Olympic footballer (Lokomotiv Sofia, Spartak Sofia, national team).
Feis Ecktuh, 32, Dutch rapper, shot.
Elizabeth Edgar, 89, New Zealand botanist.
Katie Flynn, 82, British author.
Freddie Glidden, 91, Scottish footballer (Hearts, Dumbarton).
Ivo Gregurević, 66, Croatian actor (Madonna, Fine Dead Girls, What Iva Recorded).
Joan Guinjoan, 87, Spanish composer and pianist.
Ke Hua, 103, Chinese diplomat, ambassador to Guinea, Ghana, the Philippines and the United Kingdom.
Kris Kelmi, 63, Russian singer-songwriter (Autograph), heart attack.
Bernd Kröplin, 74, German engineer and academic.
Walt McKeel, 46, American baseball player (Boston Red Sox, Colorado Rockies).
Paul Neville, 78, Australian politician, MP (1993–2013).
José Antonio Pujante, 54, Spanish politician, member of the Assembly of Murcia (since 2007), heart attack.
Raymond Ramazani Baya, 75, Congolese politician, Foreign Minister (2004–2007) and Ambassador to France (1990–1996).
Richard Rifkind, 88, American cancer researcher.
Steven P. Schinke, 73, American social work scholar.
Tu Mingjing, 90, Chinese materials scientist, member of the Chinese Academy of Engineering.
Stephen Twinoburyo, 49, Ugandan mathematician, heart attack.
María Teresa Uribe, 78, Colombian sociologist and academic (University of Antioquia).
Nils Utsi, 75, Norwegian Sámi actor (Pathfinder).
Larry Weinberg, 92, American real estate developer and sports team owner (Portland Trail Blazers).
Gilbert Winham, 80, American political scientist.
Pegi Young, 66, American educator, philanthropist, and singer-songwriter, cancer.
Perry Deane Young, 77, American journalist and playwright, cancer.

2
Ramakant Achrekar, 87, Indian cricket coach.
Kalipada Bauri, Indian politician, MLA (1971–1972).
Malcolm E. Beard, 99, American politician, member of the Florida Senate (1980–1996) and House of Representatives (1978–1980).
Darwin Bromley, 68, American game designer, founder of Mayfair Games.
Jerry Buchek, 76, American baseball player (St. Louis Cardinals, New York Mets).
Michele Caccavale, 71, Italian politician, Deputy (1994–1996).
Paulien van Deutekom, 37, Dutch Olympic speed skater (2006), world champion (2008), lung cancer.
Daryl Dragon, 76, American musician and songwriter (Captain & Tennille, The Beach Boys), renal failure.
Bob Einstein, 76, American actor (Curb Your Enthusiasm, Ocean's Thirteen) and performer (Super Dave Osborne), leukemia.
Bill Elsey, 97, British racehorse trainer (Epsom Oaks, St Leger Stakes).
Dominic Filiou, 41, Canadian strongman, heart attack.
Julia Grant, 64, British trans woman pioneer (A Change of Sex).
Gu Fangzhou, 92, Chinese virologist credited with eradicating polio in China, President of Peking Union Medical College.
Bob Hanner, 73, American politician, member of the Georgia House of Representatives (1974–2013).
Waun Ki Hong, 76, American oncologist.
Peter Kelly, 74, Irish politician, TD (2002–2011), cancer.
Geoffrey Langlands, 101, British army officer and educator.
Jerry Magee, 90, American sportswriter (The San Diego Union-Tribune, Pro Football Weekly).
Jim Margraff, 58, American football coach (Johns Hopkins Blue Jays), heart attack.
Salvador Martínez Pérez, 85, Mexican Roman Catholic prelate, Bishop of Huejutla (1994–2009).
Joe McCabe, 99, Irish hurler (Clonad, Laois).
Kevin J. McIntyre, 57, American government official, Chairman of the FERC (2017–2018), brain cancer.
Marko Nikolić, 72, Serbian actor (Bolji život).
Blake Nordstrom, 58, American businessman, co-president of Nordstrom, lymphoma.
Gene Okerlund, 76, American Hall of Fame professional wrestling interviewer (AWA, WWF, WCW), complications from a fall.
Darius Perkins, 54, Australian actor (Neighbours, Home and Away, Prisoner), cancer.
Samuel Rayan, 98, Indian theologian.
Otto Schnepp, 93, Austrian-born American scientist.
Marcellin Theeuwes, 82, Dutch Carthusian monk.
Jerzy Turonek, 89, Polish-Belarusian historian.
Tommy Watz, 60, Norwegian translator.
George Welsh, 85, American football coach (Navy Midshipmen, Virginia Cavaliers).

3
Hamza Abdullahi, 73, Nigerian politician, Military Governor of Kano State (1984–1985) and Minister of Federal Capital Territory (1986–1989).
Roger Bastié, 86, French rugby union player and coach (CA Brive).
Richard C. Bradt, 80, American materials engineer.
Bob Burrow, 84, American basketball player (Kentucky Wildcats, Minneapolis Lakers, Rochester Royals).
Joe Casely-Hayford, 62, British fashion designer, cancer.
Ernesto del Castillo, 89, Mexican Olympic equestrian (1968).
William Cochran, 84, American politician, member of the Indiana House of Representatives (1974–1982).
Sylvia Chase, 80, American news anchor (KRON, ABC World News Tonight) and journalist (20/20).
Gordon Crosby, 91, Canadian Olympic sprinter.
Chandrashekhar Shankar Dharmadhikari, 91, Indian judge and independence activist.
John Falsey, 67, American writer and producer (St. Elsewhere, I'll Fly Away, Northern Exposure), fall.
Jack Fennell, 85, English rugby league footballer (Featherstone Rovers).
Gao Chengyong, 54, Chinese serial killer and rapist, executed.
Radamel García, 61, Colombian Olympic footballer (1980), heart attack.
Theodore E. Gildred, 83, American diplomat, Ambassador to Argentina (1986–1989).
Reg Holland, 78, English footballer (Wrexham, Chester City, Altrincham).
Harold A. Hopkins Jr., 88, American Episcopal prelate, bishop of North Dakota (1980–1988).
Sayed Ashraful Islam, 67, Bangladeshi politician, MP (since 2008) and Minister of Public Administration (since 2009), lung cancer.
Kenneth Kauth, 94, American politician, member of the South Dakota House of Representatives (1969–1978).
Herb Kelleher, 87, American businessman, co-founder of Southwest Airlines.
William Miller, 62, American football player (Winnipeg Blue Bombers, Pittsburgh Maulers, Orlando Renegades), cancer.
Anne-Marie Minvielle, 75, French journalist.
Dibyendu Palit, 79, Indian writer.
Steve Ripley, 69, American musician (The Tractors), cancer.
Christine de Rivoyre, 97, French journalist (Le Monde), writer, and literary editor (Marie Claire).
John Shaw, 70, American-Canadian painter.
José Vida Soria, 81, Spanish jurist, writer and politician, Deputy (1977–1981) and rector of University of Granada (1984–1989), cancer.
Thais St. Julien, 73, American opera singer, Alzheimer's disease.
Wulf Steinmann, 88, German physicist.
William H. Stetson, American Roman Catholic priest.
Pinaki Thakur, 59, Indian poet, malaria.
Michael Yeung, 73, Chinese Roman Catholic prelate, Bishop of Hong Kong (since 2017), liver failure.

4
Milan Balabán, 89, Czech theologian, Evangelical Church of Czech Brethren pastor and anti-communist dissident (Charter 77).
Norman Birnbaum, 92, American sociologist, heart disease and sepsis.
Syed Zulfiqar Bokhari, Pakistani diplomat.
Ivan Bortnik, 79, Russian actor (Family Relations, Mirror for a Hero, Lost in Siberia).
Harold Brown, 91, American government official and nuclear physicist, Secretary of Defense (1977–1981), pancreatic cancer.
John Burningham, 82, English author and illustrator, pneumonia.
Moffatt Burriss, 99, American politician, member of the South Carolina House of Representatives (1977–1992).
Charles Currie, 88, American Jesuit academic administrator, President of the AJCU (1997–2011), Xavier University (1982–1985), and Wheeling Jesuit University (1972–1982).
Diana Decker, 93, American-born British actress (When You Come Home, The Barefoot Contessa) and singer ("Poppa Piccolino").
Harold Demsetz, 88, American economist.
Peter Doucette, 64, Canadian politician, MLA (1989–1996).
Leo J. Dulacki, 100, American general.
Turhan Erdoğan, 81, Turkish civil engineer.
Miguel Gallastegui, 100, Spanish pelotari.
David Garman, 96, British inventor and businessman.
Hakmeen Khan, Pakistani politician, founder of Pakistan Peoples Party.
Louisa Moritz, 82, Cuban-born American actress (Love, American Style, One Flew Over the Cuckoo's Nest, Loose Shoes), heart failure.
Frank Mugglestone, 94, English rugby league footballer (Bradford Northern, Castleford).
John Nallen, 86, Irish Gaelic footballer (Crossmolina, Tuam Stars, Trim).
Oldenburg Baby, 21, German abortion survivor, lung infection.
Francisco Olivencia, 84, Spanish lawyer and politician, Deputy (1979–1982) and Senator (1993–2000).
Jean Revillard, 51, Swiss photojournalist, heart attack.
Norman Snider, 74, Canadian screenwriter (Dead Ringers, Body Parts, Casino Jack).
John Thornett, 83, Australian rugby union player (New South Wales, national team).
Wiet Van Broeckhoven, 69, Belgian radio presenter and writer.
Zhang Lianwen, 73, Chinese actor.

5
Emil Brumaru, 80, Romanian writer and poet.
Sergio Otoniel Contreras Navia, 92, Chilean Roman Catholic prelate, Bishop of San Carlos de Ancud (1966–1974) and Temuco (1977–2001).
Mungau Dain, 24, Ni-Vanuatu film actor (Tanna), sepsis.
Silvano Davo, 73, Italian racing cyclist.
Rick Down, 68, American baseball hitting coach (New York Yankees, Boston Red Sox, New York Mets).
Scott Dozier, 48, American convicted murderer, suicide by hanging.
Jean-Eudes Dubé, 92, Canadian politician.
Alvin Fielder, 83, American jazz drummer, complications from heart failure and pneumonia.
Derek Foster, Baron Foster of Bishop Auckland, 81, British politician, MP for Bishop Auckland (1979–2005) and member of the House of Lords (since 2005), cancer.
Don Grierson, 77, British music industry executive.
Eric Haydock, 75, British Hall of Fame bassist (The Hollies).
Kenneth Hedberg, 98, American chemist.
Stanley Insler, 81, American philologist.
Odeen Ishmael, 70, Guyanese diplomat.
Iftekharul Alam Kislu, 92, Bangladeshi film producer (Sangam, Ora Egaro Jon, Dui Poisar Alta) and businessperson.
John Kouns, 89, American photographer and civil rights activist.
Aisha Lemu, 79, British-born Nigerian Islamic scholar.
Alan Wood Lukens, 94, American diplomat.
Maria Dolores Malumbres, 87, Spanish pianist and composer.
Pete Manning, 81, American football player (Chicago Bears, Calgary Stampedes, Toronto Argonauts).
Robert Morey, 72, American Baptist minister.
Alan R. Pearlman, 93, American sound engineer, founder of ARP Instruments.
Rudolf Raff, 77, American biologist.
John L. Said, 86, American Episcopal bishop (Southeast Florida, Central Florida).
Bernice Sandler, 90, American women's rights activist, cancer.
Dragoslav Šekularac, 81, Serbian football player (Red Star Belgrade, Yugoslavia national team) and manager (Marbella).
Alexis Smirnoff, 71, Canadian professional wrestler (NWA, AWA, WWF), kidney failure.
James H. Smylie, 93, American church historian.
Sun Ganqing, 99, Chinese major general, Chief of Staff of the Guangzhou Military Region (1969–1977) and the Kunming Military Region (1977–1980).
Myron Thompson, 82, American-born Canadian politician, MP (1993–2008), cancer.
*Antonio Torres Millera, 54, Spanish politician, member of the Aragonese Corts (since 2003), heart attack.

6
Jo Andres, 64, American filmmaker, choreographer and artist, peritoneal sclerosis.
Alfredo Arpaia, 88, Italian politician, Deputy (1982–1983).
Joe Belmont, 84, American basketball player and coach.
Annalise Braakensiek, 46, Australian model and actress (Pizza).
Johan Claassen, 89, South African rugby union player and coach (national team).
Ben Coleman, 57, American basketball player (New Jersey Nets, Philadelphia 76ers, Milwaukee Bucks).
George Crowe, 82, Canadian ice hockey coach (Dartmouth College).
Francisco Dela Cruz, 56, Northern Mariana Islands politician, member of the House of Representatives (2006–2014), heart attack.
Robert J. Doherty, 94, American photographer and graphic designer.
Odette Drand, 91, French Olympic fencer (1952).
José Ramón Fernández, 95, Cuban militant, Vice-President of the Council of Ministers (1978–2012).
Jack Garrick, 92, Australian VFL footballer (South Melbourne).
Lenny Green, 86, American baseball player (Detroit Tigers, Baltimore Orioles, Boston Red Sox).
Roy Hilton, 75, American football player (Baltimore Colts), Alzheimer's disease.
Ron Hines, 95, Australian VFL footballer (Carlton).
Robert L. Kahn, 100, American social psychologist.
Kwamie Lassiter, 49, American football player (Arizona Cardinals, San Diego Chargers, St. Louis Rams), heart attack.
Gebhardt von Moltke, 80, German diplomat, Ambassador to the UK (1997–1999).
Derek Piggott, 96, British glider pilot and flight instructor, stroke.
Ken Preston, 93, English cricketer (Essex).
Gregg Rudloff, 63, American sound mixer (Mad Max: Fury Road, The Matrix, Glory), Oscar winner (1990, 2000, 2016), suicide.
Lamin Sanneh, 76, Gambian-born American professor (Yale University, Yale Divinity School), stroke.
W. Morgan Sheppard, 86, British actor (Transformers, Max Headroom, Gettysburg).
Paul Streeten, 101, Austrian-born British economics professor.
René Steurbaut, 90, Belgian Olympic basketball player (1948).
Gustav Andreas Tammann, 86, German astronomer.
Roy Tutty, 88, Australian Olympic speed skater (1960).
Bea Vianen, 83, Surinamese writer.
Angelo Ziccardi, 90, Italian politician, Senator (1972–1983).
Gene Zwozdesky, 70, Canadian politician, Speaker of the Legislative Assembly of Alberta (2012–2015), cancer.

7
Moshe Arens, 93, Lithuanian-born Israeli aeronautical engineer and politician, Minister of Defense (1983–1984, 1990–1992, 1999) and Foreign Affairs (1988–1990).
Aristeo Benavídez, 91, Argentine alpine skier.
Helmut Berding, 88, German historian.
Barbara Elaine Ruth Brown, 89, American biologist and philanthropist.
Guy Charmot, 104, French resistance fighter.
Vytautas Einoris, 88, Lithuanian agronomist and politician.
Laurie Gilfedder, 83, English rugby league footballer (national team, Warrington, Wigan).
Jimmy Hannan, 84, Australian singer and game show host (Saturday Date), Gold Logie winner (1965), cancer.
Francisco Hernández, 69, Costa Rican football player (Saprissa, national team).
John Joubert, 91, South African-born British composer.
Aline Kiner, 59, French journalist and writer.
Clydie King, 75, American singer.
Dave Laing, 71, English writer, editor and broadcaster.
Alanna Lockward, 57, Dominican curator, writer and filmmaker.
Houari Manar, 38, Algerian raï singer, heart attack.
Ivan Mašek, 70, Czech dissident, economist and politician, Deputy (1993–1998).
John Mendelsohn, 82, American pharmacologist, President of the University of Texas MD Anderson Cancer Center (1996–2011), glioblastoma.
Harold J. Noah, 93, British-born American educational theorist.
Theodore K. Rabb, 81, American historian.
Ronald C. Read, 94, British-born Canadian mathematician.
Carmencita Reyes, 87, Filipino politician, member of the House of Representatives (2007–2010), Governor of Marinduque (1998–2007; since 2010).
A. G. Rigg, 81, British medievalist.
Tom Rukavina, 68, American politician, member of the Minnesota House of Representatives (1987–2013), leukemia.
Jocelyne Saab, 70, Lebanese journalist and film director, cancer.
Robert P. Smith, 78, American economist.
Bernard Tchoullouyan, 65, French judoka, Olympic bronze medalist (1980), heart attack.

8
Wendy Ashmore, 70, American archaeologist and anthropologist.
Pierre Barillet, 95, French actor and playwright.
José Belvino do Nascimento, 86, Brazilian Roman Catholic prelate, Bishop of Itumbiara (1981–1987) and Divinópolis (1989–2009).
Jayantilal Bhanusali, 54, Indian politician, MLA (2007–2012), shot.
Antal Bolvári, 86, Hungarian water polo player, Olympic champion (1952, 1956).
Armando Bortolaso, 92, Italian-born Syrian Roman Catholic prelate, Vicar Apostolic of Aleppo (1992–2002).
Sir William Cole, 92, Australian public servant, Secretary of the Department of Defence (1984–1986).
Georges Dimou, 87, Greek singer.
Stefan Eeckelaert, 54, Belgian darts player.
Edwin Erickson, 80, American politician, member of the Pennsylvania Senate (2001–2015).
Gao Changqing, 59, Chinese surgeon, member of the Academy of Engineering.
Khosro Harandi, 68, Iranian chess master.
Huang Chin-tao, 93, Taiwanese World War II veteran (Imperial Japanese Navy) and resistance fighter (27 Brigade).
Susanne Humphrey, 74, American medical librarian (National Library of Medicine).
Karsten Jakobsen, 90, Norwegian engineer, rector of the Norwegian Institute of Technology (1990–1993).
Sergei Khodakov, 52, Russian paralympic athlete (1992, 1996).
Guje Lagerwall, 100, Swedish actress.
Larry Langford, 72, American politician, Mayor of Birmingham, Alabama (2007–2009).
Alexia Mupende, 34, Kenyan-born Rwandan model, stabbed.
John Nye, 95, British glaciologist, heart failure.
Arturo Rojas de la Cámara, 88, Spanish cartoonist.
Julio Rubiano, 65, Colombian Olympic racing cyclist, heart attack.
Bijan Samandar, 77, Iranian poet and musician.
Giorgio Zur, 88, German Roman Catholic prelate, Apostolic Nuncio (1979–2005).

9
Filipe Abraão, 39, Angolan basketball player (Atlético Sport Aviação, Primeiro de Agosto, Recreativo do Libolo).
Ian Adamson, 74, Northern Irish politician, Lord Mayor of Belfast (1996–1997), MLA (1998–2003).
Fernando Aiuti, 83, Italian immunologist and politician, fall.
Gebran Araiji, 67, Lebanese politician.
Kjell Bäckman, 84, Swedish speed skater, Olympic bronze medalist (1960).
Verna Bloom, 80, American actress (Animal House, High Plains Drifter, The Last Temptation of Christ), complications from dementia.
Pierre de Bané, 80, Palestinian-born Canadian politician, MP (1968–2013).
Óscar González-Quevedo, 88, Spanish-born Brazilian Jesuit priest and parapsychologist, heart disease.
Earnest F. Gloyna, 97, American environmental engineer.
Joseph Lawson Howze, 95, American Roman Catholic prelate, Bishop of Biloxi (1977–2001).
Joseph Jarman, 81, American jazz musician (Art Ensemble of Chicago) and Shinshu Buddhist priest.
Conxita Julià, 98, Spanish Catalan poet.
Paul Koslo, 74, German-Canadian actor (The Omega Man, Vanishing Point, Rooster Cogburn) pancreatic cancer.
Matthew Locricchio, 71, American cookbook author and actor.
Anatoly Lukyanov, 88, Russian politician, Chairman of the Supreme Soviet of the Soviet Union (1990–1991).
Mahendra Mewati, 49, Indian actor, blood clot.
Melvin L. Moeschberger, 78, American biostatistician.
Milan Pančevski, 83, Macedonian politician, Chairman of the Presidium of the League of Communists of Yugoslavia (1989–1990).
Paolo Paoloni, 89, Italian actor (Fantozzi, An Average Little Man, Cannibal Holocaust).
Don Reynolds, 81, American child actor (Song of Arizona, The Fighting Redhead, Beyond the Purple Hills).
Thierry Séchan, 69, French novelist.
James P. Stewart, 94, American military officer.
Alan Trask, 85, American politician, member of the Florida Senate (1969–1971, 1973–1982).
Lester Wunderman, 98, American Hall of Fame advertising executive, creator of direct marketing.

10
Theo Adam, 92, German opera singer.
José Andreu García, 81, Puerto Rican jurist, Chief Justice of the Supreme Court (1992–2003).
Erminio Boso, 73, Italian politician, Senator (1992–1996), heart attack.
Edward F. Burns, 87, American politician, member of the Pennsylvania House of Representatives (1973–1990).
Andy de Groat, 72, American choreographer.
*Philippe de Lannoy, 96, Belgian noble.
*Alfredo del Mazo González, 75, Mexican politician, Governor of the State of Mexico (1981–1986) and Minister of Energy, Mines and State Industry (1986–1988).
Deng Tietao, 102, Chinese physician.
Rick Forzano, 90, American football coach (Detroit Lions).
Kevin Fret, 25, Puerto Rican musician, shot.
Martin Gore, 67, British oncologist, complications following yellow fever vaccination.
Johnny Hetki, 96, American baseball player (Cincinnati Reds, Pittsburgh Pirates).
Gerd Jaeger, 91, German sculptor and painter.
Mikel Janku, 77, Albanian footballer (Partizani, national team).
Barbara Low, 98, British-American biochemist.
Patrick Malrieu, 73, French business executive and Breton activist and historian.
Ross Lowell, 92, American photographer and inventor of gaffer tape.
John Michels, 87, American football player (Tennessee Volunteers) and coach (Minnesota Vikings).
René Mouille, 94, French aviation engineer.
Dianne Oxberry, 51, British broadcaster (BBC North West Tonight), cancer.
Lionel Price, 91, British Olympic basketball player (1948).
Juan Francisco Reyes, 80, Guatemalan politician, Vice President (2000–2004).
Ron Smith, 94, British comic artist (Judge Dredd).
Sir Conrad Swan, 94, Canadian-born British officer of arms.
Arnold Tucker, 95, American military officer and football player.

11
Hugo Alarcón, 26, Chilean footballer (Deportes La Pintana, Deportes Linares, Deportes Melipilla).
Sir Michael Atiyah, 89, British mathematician, President of the Royal Society (1990–1995).
Rafael Arcadio Bernal Supelano, 84, Colombian Roman Catholic prelate, Bishop of Arauca (1990–2003) and Líbano-Honda (2003–2004).
Wayne Blair, 70, New Zealand cricketer (Otago).
George Brady, 90, Czech-Canadian Holocaust survivor and businessman.
Tom Brosius, 69, American track and field athlete, pancreatic cancer.
Marge Callaghan, 97, Canadian baseball player (All-American Girls Professional Baseball League).
Walter Chandoha, 98, American photographer.
Angelo Constantino, 48, Filipino bowler, shot.
Michel Dejouhannet, 83, French racing cyclist.
Mark Elliot, 65, Canadian radio host (CFRA), pneumonia.
Gus Ganakas, 92, American college basketball coach (Michigan State).
J. D. Gibbs, 49, American race car driver, co-owner of Joe Gibbs Racing, degenerative neurological disease.
John G. Gunderson, 76, American psychiatrist, prostate cancer.
David Hinkley, 74–75, British-born American statistician.
Khalida Hussain, 82, Pakistani fiction writer.
Robert Horn, 87, American Olympic water polo player.
Elaine Koppelman, 81, American mathematician.
Steffan Lewis, 34, Welsh politician, AM (since 2016), bowel cancer.
Fernando Luján, 79, Mexican actor (Overboard, Día de muertos, Dangers of Youth), respiratory failure.
Andrew MacLachlan, 77, British actor (Monty Python's Life of Brian, A Fish Called Wanda, By the Sword Divided).
Sue Povey, 76, British geneticist.
Kishore Pradhan, 82, Indian actor.
Dinanath Pandey, 85, Indian politician, MLA (1977–1985) and (1990–1995).
Mary Randlett, 94, American photographer.
Meera Sanyal, 57, Indian banker, cancer.
Walter V. Shipley, 83, American businessman, CEO of Chase Manhattan Bank (1996–1999).
Dimitris Sioufas, 75, Greek politician, Speaker of the Parliament (2007–2009).
Bjørg Skjælaaen, 85, Norwegian Olympic figure skater.
Charles Soreng, 84, Indian Roman Catholic prelate, Bishop of Daltonganj (1989–1995) and Hazaribag (1995–2012).
Tom Warner, 70, American politician, member of the Florida House of Representatives (1992–1999), cancer.
Jumping Johnny Wilson, 91, American basketball player (Harlem Globetrotters).

12
George Ball, 92, American entomologist.
Christian Conrad Blouin, 77, Canadian-born Papua New Guinean Roman Catholic prelate, Bishop of Lae (2007–2018).
Bo Hi Pak, 88, South Korean cleric, leader of the Unification Church.
Anthony Colaizzo, 88, American politician, member of the Pennsylvania House of Representatives (1989–1998).
A. Brian Deer, 74, Canadian librarian, developer of the Brian Deer Classification System.
Paul Englund, 80, American biochemist, Parkinson's disease.
Bonnie Guitar, 95, American country musician ("Dark Moon").
Dennis Marvin Ham, 78, Canadian businessman and politician.
Javier de Hoz, 78, Spanish philologist and academic.
Etsuko Ichihara, 82, Japanese actress (Your Name, Hideyoshi, The Great Adventure of Horus, Prince of the Sun), heart failure.
Joe M. Jackson, 95, American Air Force officer, Medal of Honor recipient.
Linda Kelly, 82, English historian.
Larry Koentopp, 82, American minor-league baseball executive (Las Vegas Stars) and athletic director (Gonzaga University).
Bob Kuechenberg, 71, American football player (Miami Dolphins).
Max Deen Larsen, 75, American musicologist.
Batton Lash, 65, American comic book writer and artist (Supernatural Law, Archie Meets the Punisher), brain cancer.
Taw Phaya, 94, Burmese prince, Head of the Royal House of Konbaung (since 1956).
Leonard M. Pike, 78, American agricultural scientist, developed the 1015 supersweet onion.
Jaime Rosenthal, 82, Honduran politician, Third Vice President (1986–1989) and MP (2002–2006), heart attack.
Sanger D. Shafer, 84, American country songwriter ("All My Ex's Live in Texas", "Does Fort Worth Ever Cross Your Mind").
John Slim, 2nd Viscount Slim, 91, British peer, member of the House of Lords (since 1971).
Takeshi Umehara, 93, Japanese philosopher, pneumonia.
Mark Urman, 66, American film producer (ThinkFilm) and distributor, respiratory failure.
Bruno Vanryb, 61, French sound engineer and businessman, traffic collision.
Patricia Wald, 90, American judge, Chief Judge of the United States Court of Appeals for the District of Columbia Circuit (1986–1991), pancreatic cancer.
Patrick Yu, 96, Hong Kong barrister, city's first Chinese prosecutor.
Béla Zsitnik, 94, Hungarian rower, Olympic bronze medalist (1948).

13
Pierre Alard, 81, French Olympic discus thrower (1956, 1960).
Roberto Reinaldo Cáceres González, 97, Argentinian-born Uruguayan Roman Catholic prelate, Bishop of Melo (1962–1996).
Miguel Civil, 92, Spanish sumerologist.
Douglas M. Costle, 79, American environmentalist, Administrator of the Environmental Protection Agency (1977–1981), complications from a stroke.
Sally Fraser, 86, American actress (War of the Colossal Beast, It Conquered the World, Earth vs. the Spider).
Rajesh Ghodge, 43, Indian cricketer (Goa cricket team).
Francine du Plessix Gray, 88, Polish-born American author and critic.
Luella Klein, 94, American physician.
Phil Masinga, 49, South African footballer (Leeds United, Bari, national team), cancer.
Willie Murphy, 75, American blues musician (Running, Jumping, Standing Still), pneumonia.
Susanne Neumann, 59, German author and trade unionist, cancer.
Alfred K. Newman, 94, American Navajo code talker.
Francis W. Nye, 100, American major general in the U.S. Air Force.
Julen Roselló, 2, Spanish child, fall.
Serena Rothschild, 83, British racehorse owner.
Guy Sénac, 86, French footballer.
Mel Stottlemyre, 77, American baseball player (New York Yankees) and coach (New York Mets, Houston Astros), multiple myeloma.
Bo Westlake, 91, Canadian Olympic rower.

14
Ido Abram, 78, Dutch writer and educator.
Paweł Adamowicz, 53, Polish politician, Mayor of Gdańsk (since 1998), stabbed.
Bernardo Benes, 84, Cuban banker and community leader.
Milton Bluehouse Sr., 82, American politician, President of the Navajo Nation (1998–1999).
Dick Brodowski, 86, American baseball player (Boston Red Sox, Cleveland Indians).
Gonzalo Ramiro del Castillo Crespo, 82, Bolivian Roman Catholic prelate, Bishop of Military (2000–2012).
Jim Clark, 71, American baseball player (Cleveland Indians).
Roger Cuvillier, 96, French engineer and inventor.
Shivajirao Deshmukh, 84, Indian politician.
Eli Grba, 84, American baseball player (New York Yankees, Los Angeles Angels), pancreatic cancer.
Del Henney, 83, English actor (When Eight Bells Toll, Straw Dogs, Brannigan).
David N. Levinson, 83, American businessman and politician.
Peter Nambundunga, 71, Namibian military officer.
Francisco de Oliveira Dias, 88, Portuguese politician, Speaker of the Assembly (1981–1982) and Deputy (1976–1983).
Raymond G. Perelman, 101, American businessman and philanthropist.
Lenin Rajendran, 67, Indian film director (Venal, Puravrutham, Mazha) and screenwriter, complications from liver transplant.
Wilf Rosenberg, 84, South African rugby league player (Leeds, Hull, national team), stroke.
Martha Ross, 79, British actress (EastEnders, Grange Hill) and radio presenter.
Gavin Smith, 50, Canadian professional poker player.
Rainer Stadelmann, 85, German Egyptologist.
Tinca Stegovec, 91, Slovenian artist.
Devendra Swarup, 93, Indian journalist.
Julio Vallejo Ruiloba, 73, Spanish psychiatrist.
Duncan Welbourne, 78, English footballer (Watford).

15
Bill Anagnos, 60, American stuntman and actor (The Warriors, The Bourne Ultimatum, A Beautiful Mind).
Bai Hua, 88, Chinese novelist, playwright and poet.
Avraham Bendori, 90, Israeli football player (Maccabi Tel Aviv, national team) and manager (Hapoel Ramat Gan).
Bradley Bolke, 93, American voice actor (The New Casper Cartoon Show, Underdog, The Year Without a Santa Claus).
Jacques Boyon, 84, French politician, Deputy (1986, 1988–1997).
Carol Channing, 97, American Hall of Fame actress (Hello, Dolly!, Gentlemen Prefer Blondes, Thoroughly Modern Millie), singer and dancer, Tony winner (1964).
Edyr de Castro, 72, Brazilian actress (Roque Santeiro, Por Amor, Cabocla), and singer, multiple organ failure.
Giuseppe De Chirico, 84, Italian Olympic sport shooter (1968, 1972, 1976).
Xavier Gouyou-Beauchamps, 81, French prefect and director general of France 3.
Bill Graham, 81, Canadian football player (Hamilton Tiger-Cats).
Luis Grajeda, 81, Mexican Olympic basketball player (1964, 1968).
Antonín Kramerius, 79, Czech footballer (Sparta Prague, Hradec Králové, national team).
Mason Lowe, 25, American professional bull rider, chest injuries sustained during a competition.
Eduardo Martín Toval, 76, Spanish lawyer and politician, Deputy (1977–1980, 1982–1995) and member of Catalan Parliament (1980–1982).
Tim Maypray, 30, American football player (Montreal Alouettes, Ottawa Redblacks).
John J. McKetta, 103, American chemical engineer.
Mario Monje, 89, Bolivian politician, founder of Communist Party, pneumonia.
Gabriel Montcharmont, 78, French politician, Deputy (1988–1993, 1997–2002).
Jerónimo Neto, 51, Angolan handball coach, heart attack.
Miodrag Radovanović, 89, Serbian actor (The Farm in the Small Marsh, The Elusive Summer of '68, Battle of Kosovo).
Simone Rignault, 75, French politician Deputy (1993–1997).
Biraj Kumar Sarma, 70, Indian politician, liver failure.
Sir Anthony Skingsley, 85, British air chief marshal.
José Souto, 59, French footballer.
Espen Thorstenson, 78, Norwegian film director (Dager fra 1000 år, Bak sju hav).
Thelma Tixou, 75, Mexican vedette and actress (La muchacha del cuerpo de oro, Santa Sangre).
Bruce Tufeld, 66, American talent agent and manager (Laura Dern, Kelsey Grammer, Rob Lowe), liver cancer.

16
Malik Mazhar Abbas Raan, 65, Pakistani politician, member of the Provincial Assembly of the Punjab (1997–1999, since 2013), heart attack.
Gerard Basset, 61, French-born British sommelier, esophageal cancer.
John C. Bogle, 89, American investor, founder of The Vanguard Group, cancer.
François Brune, 87, French Catholic prelate and writer.
Jean Chatillon, 81, Canadian composer.
Vishnu Hari Dalmia, 94, Indian industrialist (Dalmia Group).
Lorna Doom, 61, American punk rock bassist (Germs), breast cancer.
Tom Hausman, 65, American baseball player (New York Mets, Milwaukee Brewers).
Ahmed Hussein-Suale, 31, Ghanaian journalist, shot.
Shannon M. Kent, 35, American Navy chief cryptologic technician, bombing.
Grattan Kerans, 78, American politician, member of the Oregon State Senate (1986–1993).
Alfred Kunz, 89, German-Canadian composer and conductor, heart disease.
Fernand Labrie, 81, Canadian endocrinologist and medical researcher.
Hugh Lewin, 79, South African anti-apartheid activist and writer.
Aya Maasarwe, 21, Israeli exchange student, homicide.
Hank Norton, 91, American college football coach (Ferrum College).
Mirjam Pressler, 78, German writer.
Joyce Reopel, 85, American artist.
Barry Robinson, 86, English cricketer.
Heinrich Schaarschmidt, 88, Finnish Olympic sailor (1960).
Teddi Sherman, 97, American actress and screenwriter.
Denis Sire, 65, French comics artist and illustrator.
Barbara Tsakirgis, 64, American archaeologist.
Rita Vidaurri, 94, American singer.
Unto Wiitala, 93, Finnish Hall of Fame ice hockey player and official.
Chris Wilson, 62, Australian musician (Short Cool Ones), pancreatic cancer.
Yu Min, 92, Chinese nuclear physicist.

17
Vicente Álvarez Areces, 75, Spanish politician, President of Asturias (1999–2011), Senator (since 2011) and Mayor of Gijón (1987–1999).
Babiker Awadalla, 101, Sudanese politician, Prime Minister (1969).
S. Balakrishnan, 69, Indian film score composer and music director, cancer.
Eddie Benitez, 62, American guitarist.
Francis Coutou, 71, French Olympic field hockey player (1972).
Windsor Davies, 88, Welsh actor (It Ain't Half Hot Mum, Carry On England, Never the Twain).
Steven B. Dodge, 73, American media executive, traffic collision.
Michael Hardcastle, 85, British writer of children's literature (Soccer Comes First, United!, Half a Team).
Ashrafunnesa Mosharraf, 74, Bangladeshi politician, kidney disease.
Joe O'Donnell, 77, American football player (Buffalo Bills).
Mary Oliver, 83, American poet, Pulitzer Prize winner (1984), lymphoma.
Mary Jane Osborn, 91, American biochemist and molecular biologist.
Garfield Owen, 86, Welsh rugby player (Halifax, Keighley, Newport), Parkinson's disease.
Gil Carlos Rodríguez Iglesias, 72, Spanish judge, President of the European Court of Justice (1994–2003).
Léo Rooman, 90, Belgian Olympic hockey player (1952).
Sam Savage, 78, American novelist (Firmin: Adventures of a Metropolitan Lowlife).
Turk Schonert, 62, American football player (Cincinnati Bengals, Atlanta Falcons, Stanford Cardinal), heart attack.
Tara Simmons, 34, Australian musician, breast cancer.
Helen Smith, 97, American baseball player (All-American Girls Professional Baseball League).
Daniel C. Striepeke, 88, American makeup artist (Forrest Gump, Saving Private Ryan, Mission: Impossible).
Sabrina Vlaškalić, 29, Serbian classical guitarist and teacher, traffic collision.
Anthony Watsham, 94, British-born Zimbabwean Jesuit monk and entomologist.
John Welwood, 75, American psychologist.
Keith White, 70, British sailor.
Fumiko Yonezawa, 80, Japanese theoretical physicist, heart failure.
Reggie Young, 82, American musician (The Memphis Boys).

18
Eric Aarons, 99, Australian politician.
David Abel, 83, Burmese economist and military officer, heart attack.
Boo, 12, American Pomeranian dog, Facebook celebrity, heart failure.
Gulab Chandio, 61, Pakistani actor.
John Coughlin, 33, American figure skater, suicide by hanging.
Walter Craig, 65, Canadian mathematician.
Dale Dodrill, 92, American football player (Pittsburgh Steelers).
Lena Farugia, 67, South African actress (The Gods Must Be Crazy II).
Lamia Al-Gailani Werr, 80, Iraqi archaeologist.
Gary Gutting, 76, American philosopher.
Cees Haast, 80, Dutch racing cyclist.
Reg Hart, 83, New Zealand rugby league player (national team).
Geoffrey Hewitt, 85, British chemical engineer.
Sylvia Kay, 82, British actress (Rapture, Wake in Fright, Just Good Friends).
John Krogh, 80, Norwegian footballer (Rosenborg, national team).
Robert Morey, 82, American rower, Olympic champion (1956).
Dan Orlich, 94, American football player (Green Bay Packers).
Gilles Paquet, 82, Canadian economist.
Franco Pian, 96, Italian footballer (SPAL, Internazionale, Legnano).
François Protat, 73–74, Canadian cinematographer (Weekend at Bernie's, Johnny Mnemonic, Joshua Then and Now).
Brian Stowell, 82, Manx reporter (Manx Radio), linguist, physicist and author, Reih Bleeaney Vanannan winner (2008).
William A. Thomas, 70, American college football player and coach (Tennessee State Tigers).
Etienne Vermeersch, 84, Belgian philosopher, euthanasia.
Ivan Vutsov, 79, Bulgarian football player (Levski Sofia, national team) and manager (Spartak Pleven).
Glen Wood, 93, American racing driver, co-founder of Wood Brothers Racing.
Peter Zander, 96, German-born British actor (Mystery Submarine, Rotten to the Core, The Return of Mr. Moto), complications from a stroke.

19
Atin Bandyopadhyay, 85, Bangladeshi writer, stroke.
Mario Bertoncini, 86, Italian composer, pianist, and music educator.
Jagjit Singh Chopra, 84, Indian neurologist, complications from a stroke.
Gert Frank, 62, Danish cyclist, Olympic bronze medalist (1976), heart attack.
Robert Furlonger, 97, Australian diplomat.
Nathan Glazer, 95, American sociologist.
Thomas Habinek, 65, American classical scholar, liver cancer.
Henry Horwitz, 80, American historian.
Barthélémy Kotchy, 84, Ivorian writer and politician.
Liang Jingkui, 87, Chinese physical chemist, member of the Chinese Academy of Sciences.
Ted McKenna, 68, Scottish drummer (The Sensational Alex Harvey Band), haemorrhage during hernia surgery.
May Menassa, 80, Lebanese writer and journalist, ruptured aneurysm.
Tony Mendez, 78, American intelligence officer (CIA), subject of Argo, complications from Parkinson's disease.
Muriel Pavlow, 97, English actress (Malta Story, Doctor in the House, Reach for the Sky).
Mark Samson, 63, Sri Lankan actor, heart attack.
Jaswinder Singh Sandhu, 63, Indian politician, cancer.
Red Sullivan, 89, Canadian ice hockey player (Boston Bruins, New York Rangers) and coach (Pittsburgh Penguins), Alzheimer's disease.
Henry Sy, 94, Chinese-born Filipino retailer and investor (SM Investments, SM Prime).
Margaret Wigiser, 94, American baseball player (All-American Girls Professional Baseball League).

20
Tibor Baranski, 96, Hungarian-born American Righteous Among the Nations.
Paul Barrett, 78, British music manager and agent.
Rosemarie Bowe, 86, American model and actress.
Kenneth Bruffee, 84, American academic.
Fred Castledine, 81, Australian WAFL footballer (Swan Districts).
Ian Dewhirst, 82, British historian.
Klaus Enders, 81, German sidecar racer, world champion (1967, 1969–1970, 1972–1974).
Evloghios, 83, German-born Italian Orthodox bishop, Primate of the Holy Synod of Milan (since 1990).
Mustapha Filali, 97, Tunisian politician and union leader, Minister of Agriculture (1956–1957).
Ging Ginanjar, 54, Indonesian journalist (KBR, Deutsche Welle, BBC).
Ronald Hayman, 86, British critic and biographer, pneumonia.
Norman Itzkowitz, 87, American historian.
Husain Mohammad Jafri, 84, Pakistani historian. 
Dumisani Kumalo, 71, South African politician and diplomat, UN ambassador (1999–2009), asthma attack.
Jerry Kupcinet, 74, American director and producer.
John Mason, 91, American artist.
Petre Milincovici, 82, Romanian Olympic rower (1960).
Mudrooroo, 80, Australian writer.
François Perrot, 94, French actor (Toutes griffes dehors, Who Wants to Kill Sara?, Le coeur à l'ouvrage).
Leonardo Quisumbing, 79, Filipino judge, Associate Justice of the Supreme Court (1998–2009).
Jimmy Rayl, 77, American basketball player (Indiana Hoosiers, Indiana Pacers).
Lolo Rico, 84, Spanish writer, television director and journalist.
Don Schaefer, 84, American football player (Philadelphia Eagles).
Ian Shirley, 78, New Zealand social policy academic (Auckland University of Technology).
Bobby Shows, 80, American politician, member of the Mississippi House of Representatives (1992–2016).
Andrew G. Vajna, 74, Hungarian-American film producer (Nixon, Terminator 3: Rise of the Machines, Evita).
Mithra Wettimuny, 67, Sri Lankan cricketer.

21
Marcel Azzola, 91, French accordionist (Jacques Brel).
Russell Baker, 93, American writer (Growing Up), Pulitzer Prize recipient (1978, 1983), complications from a fall.
Kaye Ballard, 93, American actress (The Mothers-in-Law, The Doris Day Show) and singer ("Fly Me to the Moon"), kidney cancer.
Khandaker Abdul Baten, 72, Bangladeshi guerrilla leader and politician, MP (since 2009).
Raghbir Singh Bhola, 91, Indian field hockey player, Olympic champion (1956) and silver medalist (1960).
Edwin Birdsong, 77, American funk keyboardist.
Trond Botnen, 81, Norwegian artist.
Maxine Brown, 87, American country singer (The Browns), complications of heart and kidney disease.
Mauro Cichero, 67, Italian-born Venezuelan footballer (national team).
Evening Attire, 20, American racehorse.
Padraic Fiacc, 94, Irish poet.
Rosa González Román, 76, Chilean journalist and politician, Deputy (1998–2006).
Henri, Count of Paris, 85, French noble, Orléanist pretender to the French throne (since 1999).
Göran Högberg, 70, Swedish Olympic athlete (1980).
Nagendra Jamatia, 71, Indian politician, MLA (1977–1993 and 1998–2008).
Charles Kettles, 89, American colonel, Medal of Honor recipient.
Lothar Kobluhn, 75, German footballer (Rot-Weiß Oberhausen).
Roman Kudlyk, 77, Ukrainian poet and literary critic.
Mike Ledbetter, 33, American blues musician, complications from epilepsy.
Andrzej Liss, 68, Polish politician, member of Sejm (2002–2007).
Richard H. Lyon, 89, American acoustical engineer.
Ismail Mačev, 59, Macedonian Olympic sprinter (1988), lung cancer.
Pedro Manfredini, 83, Argentine footballer (Racing Club, Roma, national team).
Giuseppe Minardi, 90, Italian racing cyclist.
Lupando Mwape, 68, Zambian politician, Vice-President (2004–2006).
Leo Paquette, 84, American chemist, Parkinson's disease.
John Russell, 83, British rower, Olympic silver medalist (1964).
Emiliano Sala, 28, Argentine footballer (Bordeaux, Nantes, Cardiff City), plane crash.
Shivakumara Swami, 111, Indian Lingayat spiritual leader and educationist, Seer of Siddaganga Matha (since 1941), lung infection.
Yıldırım Uran, 63, Turkish football coach, heart attack.
Harris Wofford, 92, American attorney and politician, member of the U.S. Senate (1991–1995), complications from a fall.

22
Themos Anastasiadis, 61, Greek journalist and publisher, cancer.
Koos Andriessen, 90, Dutch politician and economist, Minister of Economic Affairs (1963–1965, 1989–1994).
Ahmed Imtiaz Bulbul, 63, Bangladeshi musician and political activist, heart attack.
Leonard Dinnerstein, 84, American historian.
Andrew Fairlie, 55, Scottish chef, brain cancer.
James Frawley, 82, American television and film director (The Monkees, The Muppet Movie), Emmy winner (1967), heart attack.
Éric Holder, 58, French novelist.
Kin Kaung, 55, Burmese comedian and actor.
A. Kumarathurai, 79, Sri Lankan politician, founder of Kumarapuram.
John Lindley, 85, English rugby league player (Wakefield Trinity).
Bill Mackrides, 93, American football player (Philadelphia Eagles, New York Giants, Pittsburgh Steelers).
Eileen Massey, 83, Australian cricketer.
Maureen Murphy, 79, American Olympic swimmer (1956), heart attack.
Bernarr Notley, 100, English cricketer (Nottinghamshire).
Kiril Petkov, 85, Bulgarian wrestler, Olympic silver medalist (1964).
Jean-Maurice Rouquette, 87, French historian.
John M. Smith, 83, American Roman Catholic prelate, Bishop of Pensacola–Tallahassee (1991–1995) and Trenton (1997–2010).
Wolfgang Thonke, 80, German military officer.
Charles Vandenhove, 91, Belgian architect.

23
Steven H. Amick, 71, American politician, member of the Delaware House of Representatives (1987–1995) and Senate (1995–2009).
Diana Athill, 101, British literary editor and novelist.
Richard Bodycombe, 96, American military officer.
Jack Brinkley, 88, American politician, educator and lawyer, member of the U.S. House of Representatives from Georgia's 3rd district (1967–1983).
Mervyn Brooker, 64, British cricketer, meningitis.
Jacqueline Casalegno, 93, French businesswoman.
Bradnee Chambers, 52, Canadian environmentalist.
Pierre Delaunay, 99, French sports official, General Secretary of UEFA (1955–1960).
Dick Dolman, 83, Dutch politician, Speaker (1979–1989) and member of the House of Representatives (1970–1990), member of the Council of State (1990–2003).
Ayşen Gruda, 74, Turkish actress and comedian, pancreatic cancer.
Nils Hasselmo, 87, Swedish-American academic administrator, President of the University of Minnesota (1988–1997) and the AAU (1998–2006), prostate cancer.
Wayne H. Holtzman, 96, American psychologist.
Howard S. Irwin, 90, American botanist.
Anthony de Jasay, 93, Hungarian economist and philosopher.
Lin Ching-hsuan, 65, Taiwanese writer, heart attack.
Jim McKean, 73, Canadian baseball umpire, heart attack.
Jonas Mekas, 96, Lithuanian-born American film director (Walden, Reminiscences of a Journey to Lithuania, As I Was Moving Ahead Occasionally I Saw Brief Glimpses of Beauty) and poet.
Hidekichi Miyazaki, 108, Japanese masters athlete, cerebral hemorrhage.
Oliver Mtukudzi, 66, Zimbabwean musician, complications from diabetes.
Georges Nasser, 91, Lebanese film director.
Reijo Nykänen, 88, Finnish Olympic wrestler (1956).
Norman Orentreich, 96, American dermatologist.
Aloysius Pang, 28, Singaporean actor (Timeless Love, Young & Fabulous), complications from crushed torso.
Ryszard Peryt, 71, Polish conductor and librettist.
Volodymyr Sitkin, 84, Ukrainian Olympic athlete (1956).
Alexandra Svetlitskaya, 47, Russian footballer (national team).
Sitaram Rao Valluri, 94, Indian-born American engineer.
Johnny Walker, 90, Scottish footballer (Wolverhampton Wanderers, Southampton, Reading).
Adam Watson, 88, Scottish scientist and mountaineer.
Jean-Pierre Wintenberger, 64, French mathematician.
Erik Olin Wright, 71, American Marxist sociologist, acute myeloid leukemia.
Willie York, 74, American homeless activist, diabetes and prostate cancer.

24
Fernando Sebastián Aguilar, 89, Spanish Roman Catholic cardinal, Bishop of León (1979–1983) and Archbishop of Pamplona and Tudela (1983–2007), stroke.
Vito Andrés Bártoli, 89, Argentine football player (Atlético Chalaco, Deportivo Cali) and manager (Deportivo Municipal).
Elio Berhanyer, 89, Spanish fashion designer.
William R. Bradford, 85, American LDS Church general authority.
Pierre Delaunay, 99, French sports official, General Secretary of UEFA (1955–1960).
Peter Eele, 83, English cricket player (Somerset) and umpire.
Norman Goodman, 95, American municipal clerk (Manhattan).
Jerard Hurwitz, 90, American biochemist.
Antonio Marchesano, 88, Uruguayan politician, President of the Chamber of Deputies (1985–1986) and Interior Minister (1986–1989).
Rosemary Bryant Mariner, 65, American naval aviator, ovarian cancer.
Jim McCabe, 96, Australian politician, member of the Victorian Legislative Assembly (1964–1967, 1970–1979).
Hugh McIlvanney, 84, Scottish sports writer (The Sunday Times).
Alain de Mijolla, 85, French psychoanalyst.
Robert H. Mounce, 97, American biblical scholar.
Kiço Mustaqi, 80, Albanian military officer and politician.
Altino Pinto de Magalhães, 96, Portuguese military officer and politician, President of the Regional Junta of the Azores (1975–1976).
Gérard Poulain, 82, French Olympic field hockey player (1960).
Nigel Saddington, 53, English footballer (Doncaster Rovers, Carlisle United, Gateshead), heart disease.

25
Fatima Ali, 29, Pakistani-born American chef and reality show contestant (Chopped, Top Chef), Ewing's sarcoma.
Thomas Andretta, 81, American Union business agent and mob associate.
Roohi Bano, 67, Pakistani actress, kidney failure.
Steve Bell, 83, American television anchor (Good Morning America, World News This Morning) and academic (Ball State University).
Jacques Berthelet, 84, Canadian Roman Catholic prelate, Auxiliary Bishop (1986–1996) and Bishop of Saint-Jean-Longueuil (1996–2010).
Bruce Corbitt, 56, American musician (Rigor Mortis, Warbeast), esophageal cancer.
Deng Zongjue, 102, Chinese zoologist.
Albert J. Dunlap, 81, American corporate executive (Scott Paper Company, Coleman Company, Sunbeam Products).
Erik Dwi Ermawansyah, 22, Indonesian footballer (Bhayangkara, Madura United, PSIS Semarang), heart attack.
Mick Ewing, 98, American football coach (Chicago Maroons).
Stanley Hill, 82, American union leader, pneumonia.
John Jeffries, 89, New Zealand politician and judge.
Florence Knoll, 101, American architect and furniture designer.
Donald N. Langenberg, 86, American academic, Chancellor of the University System of Maryland (1990–2002), aortic aneurysm.
Erwin Lienhard, 62, Swiss racing cyclist.
Dušan Makavejev, 86, Serbian film director (Man Is Not a Bird, W.R.: Mysteries of the Organism, The Coca-Cola Kid).
Anne Marev, 86, Belgian actress.
George McMahon, 89, Canadian politician, member of the Legislative Assembly of Prince Edward Island (1976–1987).
Vigilio Mario Olmi, 91, Italian Roman Catholic prelate, Auxiliary Bishop of Brescia (1986–2003).
Renzo Pigni, 93, Italian politician, Deputy (1953–1972) and Mayor of Como (1992–1993).
Meshulam Riklis, 95, Turkish-born American-Israeli businessman.
Boniface Tshosa Setlalekgosi, 91, Botswanan Roman Catholic prelate, Bishop of Gaborone (1981–2005).
Krishna Sobti, 93, Indian author.
Jacqueline Steiner, 94, American folk singer-songwriter and social activist.
Jaume Traserra Cunillera, 84, Spanish Roman Catholic prelate, Bishop of Solsona (2001–2010).
Michael Trieb, 82, German urban planner.
Vasillaq Zëri, 66, Albanian footballer (Dinamo Tirana and national team).

26
Robert Adams, VI, 55, American politician, cancer.
Dale Barnstable, 93, American basketball player (Kentucky Wildcats).
Duane Benson, 73, American football player (Oakland Raiders) and politician, member of the Minnesota Senate (1980–1994), cancer.
Patrick Bricard, 78, French actor (The Umbrellas of Cherbourg, Le Distrait, L'Île aux enfants).
Aleksandr Danilin, 57, Russian Olympic speed skater (1984).
Boško Đokić, 65, Serbian basketball coach and journalist, heart attack.
Éric Duyckaerts, 65, Belgian artist.
Jean Guillou, 88, French composer, organist and pianist.
John Henderson, 90, New Zealand cricketer (Central Districts).
Howard Haugerud, 94, American government official.
Elisabet Helsing, 78, Norwegian nutritional physiologist.
Nicholas Héroys, 81, English chartered accountant and cricketer.
Jumani Johansson, 45, Malawian-Swedish possible heir of President Hastings Banda.
Henrik Jørgensen, 57, Danish Olympic marathon runner (1984, 1988), heart attack.
Michel Legrand, 86, French composer (The Thomas Crown Affair, Summer of '42, Yentl), conductor and jazz pianist, Oscar winner (1968, 1971, 1983).
Wilma Lipp, 93, Austrian operatic soprano.
Mao Dehua, 83, Chinese geographer and politician, Vice Chairman of Xinjiang.
Luděk Munzar, 85, Czech actor (The Joke, Poslední propadne peklu), complications from Parkinson's disease.
Ndaye Mulamba, 70, Congolese footballer (Bantous, Vita Club, national team).
Mick O'Rourke, 72, Irish Gaelic footballer (Offaly).
Bill Ortwein, 78, American politician, member of the Tennessee Senate (1977–1985).
Gerry Plamondon, 95, Canadian ice hockey player (Montreal Canadiens).
Mary Lou Robinson, 92, American senior judge, U.S. District Court Judge for the Northern District of Texas (1979–2016).
David Sellar, 77, Scottish heraldry regulator, Lord Lyon King of Arms (2008–2014).
Eka Tjipta Widjaja, 97, Chinese-born Indonesian banker, founder of the Sinar Mas Group.
Giuseppe Zamberletti, 85, Italian politician, MP (1968–1994), Minister of Public Works (1987) and of Protezione Civile (1981–1982, 1984–1987).

27
Paul Balta, 89, French journalist.
Marshall E. Blume, 77, American economist.
Joseph Buttigieg, 71, Maltese-American literary scholar.
Betty Carveth, 93, Canadian baseball player.
Henry Chapier, 85, Romanian-born French journalist and film critic.
Nurul Alam Chowdhury, 73, Bangladeshi politician and diplomat.
Yvonne Clark, 89, American engineer.
Thomas Jones Enright, 71, American mathematician, complications from Parkinson's disease.
Sir Reginald Eyre, 94, British politician, MP for Birmingham Hall Green (1965–1987).
Nina Fyodorova, 71, Russian cross-country skier, Olympic (1976) and world champion (1970, 1974).
Bill Goodacre, 67, Canadian politician.
Mike Harrison, 78, English footballer (Chelsea, Blackburn Rovers, Luton Town).
Emmanuel Hocquard, 78, French poet.
Peter Magowan, 76, American businessman, co-owner of the San Francisco Giants, CEO and chairman of Safeway, cancer.
Countess Maya von Schönburg-Glauchau, 60, German socialite, lung cancer.
Eve Oja, 70, Estonian mathematician.
Anant Prasad Singh, 92, Indian politician, MLA (1969–1977).
Matt Turner, 51, American baseball player (Florida Marlins, Cleveland Indians), Hodgkin's lymphoma.
Erica Yohn, 88, American actress (An American Tail, Pee-wee's Big Adventure, Corrina, Corrina).

28
Humberto Akʼabal, 66, Guatemalan K'iche' Maya poet.
Vere Claiborne Chappell, 88, American philosopher.
Ingvald Godal, 84, Norwegian politician, MP (1985–2001).
Susan Hiller, 78, American artist.
Jon T. Hougen, 82, American chemist.
Jørgen Jørgensen, 75, Danish footballer (Holbæk B&I, Sandvikens IF, national team).
Antônio Petrus Kalil, 93, Brazilian criminal, pneumonia.
Kim Bok-dong, 92, South Korean women's rights activist, cancer.
Jurrie Koolhof, 59, Dutch footballer (PSV Eindhoven, Vitesse, national team).
Mourad Medelci, 75, Algerian politician, Minister of Foreign Affairs (2007–2013).
Bernard Middleton, 94, British restoration bookbinder.
Mavis Ngallametta, 75, Australian painter and weaver.
Noel Rawsthorne, 89, British organist and composer.
Henry Saavedra, 81, American politician, member of the New Mexico House of Representatives (1977–2015).
Tahseen Said, 86, Iraqi politician, Mir of the Yazidis (since 1944).
Yoskar Sarante, 49, Dominican bachata singer, pulmonary fibrosis.
Otto Schubiger, 94, Swiss ice hockey player (national team), Olympic bronze medalist (1948).
Ishtvan Sekech, 79, Hungarian-born Russian football player (Avanhard Ternopil, CSKA Moscow) and manager (Temp Shepetivka).
Wickham Skinner, 94, American business theorist.
Pepe Smith, 71, Filipino rock musician (Juan de la Cruz Band, Speed, Glue & Shinki, Asin), heart failure.
John Raymond Smythies, 96, British neuroscientist.
Arthur Turner, 98, English footballer (Colchester United, Charlton Athletic).
Marc Viénot, 90, French banking executive.
Doris L. Wethers, 91, American pediatrician, complications from a stroke.
Paul Whaley, 72, American drummer (The Oxford Circle, Blue Cheer), heart failure.
Dawit Yohannes, 62, Ethiopian politician, Speaker of the House of People's Representatives (1995–2005).

29
Jane Aamund, 82, Danish author and journalist.
Dipak Bhattacharjee, 79, Indian politician, MLA (1978–1983).
Kenneth A. Black Jr., 86, American politician, member of the New Jersey General Assembly (1968–1974).
Elaine Bonazzi, 89, American opera singer.
Jean-Pierre Boccardo, 76, French Olympic sprinter (1964, 1968).
Hans Normann Dahl, 81, Norwegian illustrator and painter.
George Fernandes, 88, Indian politician, Minister of Railways (1989–1990) and Defence (1998–2001, 2001–2004), MP (1996–2010), complications from swine flu.
Jean-Marc Fontaine, 74, French mathematician.
Fernando Gaitán, 58, Colombian screenwriter (Café, con aroma de mujer, Yo soy Betty, la fea), heart attack.
Ian George, 84, Australian Anglican prelate, Archbishop of Adelaide (1991–2004).
Zdravko Grebo, 71, Bosnian legal scholar.
Andy Hebenton, 89, Canadian ice hockey player (New York Rangers).
Denis Hunt, 81, English football player (Gillingham, Brentford) and manager (Ashford Town).
Charles J. Hynes, 83, American lawyer and politician, Kings County District Attorney (1990–2013).
James Ingram, 66, American R&B singer-songwriter ("Baby, Come to Me", "I Don't Have the Heart", "Yah Mo B There"), Grammy winner (1982, 1985), brain cancer.
*Jin Guozhang, 91, Chinese pharmacologist, psychopathologist and educator.
Gerri Lawlor, 49–50, American actress and voice actress, co-creator of Simlish.
Muhammad Arshad Khan Lodhi, 81, Pakistani politician, member of the Provincial Assembly of the Punjab (2013–2018).
Alf Lüdtke, 75, German historian.
Antonio Mercader, 74, Spanish-born Uruguayan journalist, lawyer and politician, Minister of Education and Culture (1992–1995, 2000–2002).
Mohammad Nabi Habibi, 73, Iranian politician, Mayor of Tehran (1984–1987), heart attack.
Aize Obayan, 58, Nigerian academic administrator, Vice Chancellor of Covenant University (2005–2012), cancer.
Ivan Sergeyevich Obolensky, 93, American financial analyst, naval officer and publisher.
Egisto Pandolfini, 92, Italian footballer (Fiorentina, Roma, national team).
Paul Gutama Soegijo, 84, German composer and musician.
Sanford Sylvan, 65, American baritone, heart attack.
William Van Alstyne, 84, American legal scholar.
Jan Wahl, 87, American children's writer, cancer.

30
Nehanda Abiodun, 68, American rap music activist.
Stewart Adams, 95, British chemist, developer of ibuprofen.
Harlan Anderson, 89, American computer engineer, co-founder of Digital Equipment Corporation.
Jaime Ardila Casamitjana, 100, Colombian writer.
George Austin, 87, British Anglican priest, Archdeacon of York (1988–1999).
Maureen Brunt, 90, Australian economist.
Dara Dotiwalla, 85, Indian cricket umpire.
Tohru Eguchi, 70, Japanese theoretical physicist, heart failure.
Diane Gaidry, 54, American actress (The Dogwalker, Loving Annabelle), cancer.
Alan Hayes, 79, Australian VFL footballer (Richmond).
Dame Felicity Hill, 103, British Royal Air Force officer, Director of WRAF (1966–1969).
Saphira Indah, 32, Indonesian actress, lung infection.
Per Jorsett, 98, Norwegian freelance sports reporter.
Jadwiga Książek, 79, Polish volleyball player, Olympic bronze medalist (1964, 1968).
Jean Ledoux, 83, French Olympic rower (1960).
Murray Loudon, 97, New Zealand Olympic field hockey player (1956).
Peter Mikkelsen, 58, Danish football referee, cancer.
Dick Miller, 90, American actor (Gremlins, The Little Shop of Horrors, Batman: Mask of the Phantasm).
Douglas Myall, 96, British civil servant and philatelist.
Bernard Nevill, 84, British textile designer.
B. E. Vijayam, 85, Indian geologist.
Duncan Weldon, 77, English theatre producer (Private Lives), Tony winner (2002).
Lori Wilson, 81, American politician, member of the Florida Senate (1973–1978).

31
Harold Bradley, 93, American Hall of Fame country musician.
Candice Earley, 68, American actress (All My Children), multiple system atrophy.
A. Ernest Fitzgerald, 92, American engineer and government whistleblower.
David Hawkins, 81, British Royal Air Force officer.
Kálmán Ihász, 77, Hungarian footballer (Vasas, national team).
Ron Joyce, 88, Canadian businessman, co-founder of Tim Hortons.
Pablo Larios, 58, Mexican footballer (Cruz Azul, Puebla, national team), complications from intestinal occlusion.
Johnny Lion, 77, Dutch singer and actor, lung cancer.
Pierre Nanterme, 59, French business executive (Accenture), colon cancer.
Nancy B. Reich, 94, American musicologist.
Georges Sarre, 83, French politician, Deputy (1981–2002).
Graham Stilwell, 73, British tennis player, neuro-muscular disorder.
Don Storm, 86, American politician, member of the Minnesota Senate (1983–1991).
Andrzej Wieckowski, 73, Polish-born American chemist.
William Winegard, 94, Canadian politician, MP (1984–1993).

References

2019-01
 1